Beneath the Sky was an American metalcore band from Cincinnati, Ohio. The band originally formed in 2004 and disbanded in 2014, having released 3 studio albums through Victory Records.

Background
Beneath the Sky formed in mid-2004 after the collapse of their previous bands Makeshyft and Blind Judgment.
Through constant promotion and regional touring, Beneath The Sky have gained fans across the United States and in other parts of the world, including Lithuania. In January 2005, Beneath The Sky released a four-song demo that distributed over 5000 copies before its retirement in late 2005.

Beneath The Sky completed work on a new album at Track Six Recording, Inc. in Cleveland, Ohio with producer Don Debiase and producer/mixer/engineer Brandon Youngs.

Towards the end of 2007, Beneath The Sky were nominated for a Cincinnati Music Award in the Hard Rock/Metal category by CityBeat Magazine.

On March 22, 2008 in a MySpace blog, the band confirmed the addition of two new members, guitarist/vocalist Kevin Stafford and drummer Bryan Cash, who both replaced guitarist Chris Profitt and drummer Brandon Sowder. The blog confirmed the departure of keytarist Matt Jones. The band's second album was released on June 24, 2008.

On August 15, 2008 in a Myspace blog, the band announced that they had broken up. The band was signed to Victory Records until 2008.

As of March 13, 2009, Beneath The Sky had been separated due to a problem with their finances but, in a MySpace blog, confirmed that they had reunited and are set to start touring again.

On May 11, 2010, they released their album, "In Loving Memory."

A post on their Facebook page on August 1, 2011 stated that they have nothing to report: "There is nothing to update unfortunately. No new album in the works. But we still like you guys and hopefully you guys still like us! so let's keep posting and sharing good stuff!"

They played a reunion show on January 26, 2013, and according to Chris, there are so far 6 new songs in the works. He said that if a new album is not right for the band, then they will simply release the songs online. The band posted a video of the first test post hiatus, the video shows some members of the original lineup. On July 23, 2014, however, they shared a statement by Chris from the day before via their Facebook page, announcing a breakup and a farewell show in Covington, Kentucky set for September 20.

Band members

Final lineup
 Joey Nelson – unclean vocals (2004–2008, 2009–2014)
 Jeff Nelson – guitars (2004–2008, 2009–2014)
 Nick Scarberry – bass, clean vocals (2004–2008, 2012–2014)
 Chris Profitt – guitar (2004–2007, 2012–2014)
 Brandon Sowder – drums, percussion (2004–2007, 2012–2014)

Former members
 Matt Jones – keytar (2004–2007)
 Kevin Stafford – guitars, clean vocals, keyboards (2007–2008, 2009–2011)
 Bryan Cash – drums (2008, 2009–2011)
 Finn – guitars, keyboards (2009–2011)
 Randy Barnes – bass (2009–2011)

Timeline

Discography

Albums

References

External links
Official Victory Records band website

Musical groups established in 2004
Heavy metal musical groups from Ohio
Metalcore musical groups from Ohio
American deathcore musical groups
Musical groups disestablished in 2014
Musical groups from Cincinnati
Musical quintets
Victory Records artists